The Lunar Polar Exploration mission (LUPEX), also known as Chandrayaan-4, is a robotic lunar mission concept by Indian Space Research Organisation (ISRO) and Japan Aerospace Exploration Agency (JAXA) that would send a lunar rover and lander to explore the south pole region of the Moon no earlier than 2025. JAXA is likely to provide the under-development H3 launch vehicle and the rover, while ISRO would be responsible for the lander.

The mission concept is currently in conceptual phase.

History 
ISRO signed an Implementation Arrangement (IA) in December 2017 for pre-phase A, phase A study and completed the feasibility report in March 2018 with Japan Aerospace Exploration Agency (JAXA) to explore the polar regions of Moon for water with a joint Lunar Polar Exploration Mission (LUPEX) that would be launched no earlier than 2025.

ISRO and JAXA held the Joint Mission Definition Review (JMDR) in December 2018. By the end of 2019, JAXA concluded its internal Project Readiness Review.

Since Chandrayaan-2's lander crashed on the Moon during its landing attempt in September 2019, India started to study a new lunar mission namely Chandrayaan-3 as a repeat attempt to demonstrate the landing capabilities needed for the LUPEX.

On 24 September 2019, in a joint statement by JAXA and NASA discussed possibility of NASA's participation as well.

JAXA finished its domestic System Requirement Review (SRR) in early 2021.

Overview 
The Lunar Polar Exploration mission would demonstrate new surface exploration technologies related to vehicular transport and lunar night survival for sustainable lunar exploration in polar regions. For precision landing it would utilize a feature matching algorithm and navigational equipment derived from JAXA's Smart Lander for Investigating Moon (SLIM) mission. The lander's payload capacity would be  at minimum. The rover would carry multiple instruments by JAXA and ISRO including a drill to collect sub-surface samples from  depth. Water prospecting and analysis are likely to be mission objectives. 

The European Space Agency's Exospheric Mass Spectrometer L-band (EMS-L) of PROSPECT mission was originally planned to fly as a payload on the Russian Luna 27 mission, however EMS-L will now fly on this mission due to continued international collaboration being thrown into doubt by the 2022 Russian invasion of Ukraine and related sanctions on Russia. Payload proposals from other space agencies might be sought.

Payloads 
Few selected Japanese instruments along with the candidate instruments of ISRO and ESA and the invited international collaborators by JAXA.

 Ground Penetrating Radar (GPR): Underground radar observation up to 1.5 meter during rover traverse. (ISRO)
 Neutron Spectrometer (NS): Underground neutron (hydrogen) observation up to one meter during rover traverse. (NASA)
 Advanced Lunar Imaging Spectrometer (ALIS): /OH observation of the surface and drilled regolith.
 Exospheric Mass Spectrometer for LUPEX (EMS-L): Surface gas pressure and chemical species measurement. (ESA)
 REsourceInvestigation Water Analyzer (REIWA): Instrument package of the four instruments.
 Lunar Thermogravimetric Analyzer (LTGA): Thermogravimetric analyses of the drilled samples for water content.
 TRIple-reflection reflecTrON (TRITON): Identification of chemical species of the volatile component in the drilled samples based on mass spectrometry.
 Aquatic Detector using Optical Resonance (ADORE): Water content measurement in the drilled samples based on cavity ring-down spectrometry.
 ISRO Sample Analysis Package: Mineralogical and elemental measurement of the drilled samples. (ISRO)
Permittivity and Thermo-physical Investigation for Moon's Aquatic Scout (PRATHIMA): For in-situ detection and quantification of water-ice mixed with lunar regolith
Alpha Particle Spectrometer (APS)
Low Energy Gamma Ray Spectrometer (LEGRS): For measuring low energy (46.5 keV) gamma ray line to study the volatile transport on the Moon with Cadmium Zinc Telluride (CZT) detectors.

See also 

 Chandrayaan Programme
 In-situ resource utilization
 Lunar resources
 Lunar water
 VIPER (rover)

References 

Missions to the Moon
Indian lunar exploration programme
Lunar rovers
Proposed spacecraft
2024 in spaceflight